The Yolo Causeway is a  long elevated highway viaduct on Interstate 80 that crosses the Yolo Bypass floodplain, connecting the cities of West Sacramento, California and Davis, California. It is officially named the Blecher-Freeman Memorial Causeway after two California Highway Patrol officers who were killed in the line of duty just east of the causeway.

History
Ferry service was usually required to cross the Yolo Bypass basin during seasonal flooding; the first county seat of Yolo County was the town of Fremont, built near the ferry crossing near the confluence of the Sacramento and Feather Rivers. Fremont was wiped out during the floods of 1851. As an alternative, settlers established the Yolo Plankroad, which was a  route that ended close to present-day Woodland, California.

Before a causeway was built, wheeled vehicles between Davis and Sacramento were forced to detour south through Tracy and Stockton during seasonal flooding. Once the ground was sufficiently dry to support vehicle traffic, the first vehicle to make it across the Yolo Bypass established the seasonal "Tule Jake" Road, which was typically passable only during the summer months.

1916 causeway

Residents celebrated with the four day-long Causeway Celebration, held from May 11–14, 1916.

Initially, the causeway was composed of a timber trestle section ( long on the west) and a concrete trestle section (remaining length), with a  plate girder bascule span, which was opened to permit passage of levee maintenance barges. The causeway width was doubled in 1933 when a new all-timber viaduct was added just south of the 1916 reinforced concrete structure; lights were added in 1950.

The Lincoln Highway association initially declined to shift its route to take advantage of the Yolo Causeway, but in 1928, following the completion of the Carquinez Bridge, it was made a part of the re-routed Lincoln Highway, the first road across America. Later, the causeway became a part of US Highways 40 and 99W.

1962 causeway
The current causeway was built in 1962. From west to east, the causeway is composed of twinned  concrete trestles, a  earth fill segment, and twinned  concrete trestles. The easternmost of the two bridges is the longer of the two and traffic reporters will sometimes refer to the two structures as the "long bridge" and the "short bridge".

It was renamed the "Blecher-Freeman Memorial Causeway" in 1994, after two California Highway Patrol officers who were shot to death in 1978  after a highway stop near the causeway.

Proposed improvements

In 2018, Caltrans announced plans to extend the carpool lane along I-80 from Solano County to Sacramento County, which includes plans to widen the causeway to four lanes in each direction. The proposed widening would not start until at least 2024, and the project is estimated to cost $800 million. One proposed alternative would use the extra lane as a toll lane.

Bypass

The  Yolo Bypass protects Sacramento and other California Central Valley communities from flooding.  During wet seasons, it can be full of water. It contains the Vic Fazio Yolo Wildlife Area, the largest ecological restoration project west of the Everglades. Other nature preserves in it include the Fremont Weir Wildlife Area and Yolo Bypass Wildlife Area.

When seasonal rains cause the river to rise, water is diverted via the concrete Fremont Weir into the Yolo Bypass floodplain. The Yolo Bypass can carry up to five times the capacity of the Sacramento River, preventing it from flooding Sacramento. The diverted water re-enters the Sacramento River delta near Rio Vista.

Approximately 250,000 Mexican free-tailed bats migrate to the Yolo Causeway every June. They roost in the expansion joints between the causeway segments, and feed on the insects that live in the wetlands formed by the Yolo Bypass.

Causeway Classic

The Causeway Classic, an annual college football game between the Aggies of the University of California, Davis and the Hornets of California State University, Sacramento, is named after the causeway. A trophy made from a concrete core sample taken from the causeway is awarded to the winner.

See also

References

External links
 Yolo Causeway - Davis Wiki
 Caltrans timeline
 CHP Memorial: Blecher-Freeman
 
 
 

Bridges over the Sacramento River
Bridges in Yolo County, California
Causeways in the United States
Concrete bridges in California
Roads in Yolo County, California
Interstate 80
U.S. Route 99
Bridges on the Interstate Highway System
Viaducts in the United States
Road bridges in California